In Greek mythology, Tiresias was a blind prophet of Apollo in Thebes, famous for clairvoyance and for being transformed into a woman for seven years. He was the son of the shepherd Everes and the nymph Chariclo. Tiresias participated fully in seven generations in Thebes, beginning as advisor to Cadmus himself.

Mythology
Eighteen allusions to mythic Tiresias, noted by Luc Brisson, fall into three groups: the first recounts Tiresias' sex-change episode and later his encounter with Zeus and Hera; the second group recounts his blinding by Athena; the third, all but lost, seems to have recounted the misadventures of Tiresias.

Blindness and gift of prophecy 

Like other oracles, how Tiresias obtained his information varied: sometimes, he would receive visions; other times he would listen for the songs of birds, or ask for a description of visions and pictures appearing within the smoke of burnt offerings or entrails, and so interpret them. Pliny the Elder credits Tiresias with the invention of augury.

On Mount Cyllene in the Peloponnese, as Tiresias came upon a pair of copulating snakes, he hit the pair with his stick. Hera was displeased, and she punished Tiresias by transforming him into a woman. As a woman, Tiresias became a priestess of Hera, married and had children, including Manto, who also possessed the gift of prophecy. After seven years as a woman, Tiresias again found mating snakes; depending on the myth, either she made sure to leave the snakes alone this time, or, according to Hyginus, trampled on them. Either way, as a result, Tiresias was released from his sentence and permitted to regain his masculinity. This ancient story was recorded in lost lines of Hesiod.

In Hellenistic and Roman times Tiresias' sex-change was embellished and expanded into seven episodes, with appropriate amours in each, probably written by the Alexandrian Ptolemaeus Chennus, but attributed by Eustathius to Sostratus of Phanagoria's lost elegiac Tiresias. Tiresias is presented as a complexly liminal figure, mediating between humankind and the gods, male and female, blind and seeing, present and future, this world and the Underworld. According to Eustathius, Tiresias was originally a woman who promised Apollo her favours in exchange for musical lessons, only to reject him afterwards. She was turned by Apollo into a man, then again a woman under unclear circumstances, then a man by the offended Hera, then into a woman by Zeus. She becomes a man once again after an encounter with the Muses, until finally Aphrodite turns him into a woman again and then into a mouse.

According to the mythographic compendium Bibliotheke, different stories were told of the cause of his blindness, the most direct being that he was simply blinded by the gods for revealing their secrets. An alternative story told by  Pherecydes was followed in Callimachus' poem "The Bathing of Pallas"; in it, Tiresias was blinded by Athena after he stumbled onto her bathing naked. His mother, Chariclo, a nymph of Athena, begged Athena to undo her curse, but the goddess could not; instead, she cleaned his ears, giving him the ability to understand birdsong, thus the gift of augury. In a separate episode, Tiresias was drawn into an argument between Hera and her husband Zeus, on the theme of who has more pleasure in sex: the man, as Hera claimed, or, as Zeus claimed, the woman. As Tiresias had experienced both, Tiresias replied, "Of ten parts a man enjoys one only." Hera instantly struck him blind for his impiety. Zeus could do nothing to stop her or reverse her curse, but in recompense he did give Tiresias the gift of foresight and a lifespan of seven lives.

He is said to have understood the language of birds and could divine the future from indications in a fire, or smoke. However, it was the communications of the dead he relied on the most, menacing them when they were late to attend him.

Tiresias makes a dramatic appearance in the Odyssey, book XI, in which Odysseus calls up the spirits of the dead (the nekyia). "So sentient is Tiresias, even in death," observes Marina Warner "that he comes up to Odysseus and recognizes him and calls him by name before he has drunk the black blood of the sacrifice; even Odysseus' own mother cannot accomplish this, but must drink deep before her ghost can see her son for himself."

As a seer, "Tiresias" was "a common title for soothsayers throughout Greek legendary history" (Graves 1960, 105.5). In Greek literature, Tiresias' pronouncements are always given in short maxims which are often cryptic (gnomic), but never wrong. Often when his name is attached to a mythic prophecy, it is introduced simply to supply a personality to the generic example of a seer, not by any inherent connection of Tiresias with the myth: thus it is Tiresias who tells Amphitryon of Zeus and Alcmena and warns the mother of Narcissus that the boy will thrive as long as he never knows himself. This is his emblematic role in tragedy (see below). Like most oracles, he is generally extremely reluctant to offer the whole of what he sees in his visions.

Tiresias and Thebes

Tiresias appears as the name of a recurring character in several stories and Greek tragedies concerning the legendary history of Thebes. In The Bacchae, by Euripides, Tiresias appears with Cadmus, the founder and first king of Thebes, to warn the current king Pentheus against denouncing Dionysus as a god. Along with Cadmus, he dresses as a worshiper of Dionysus to go up the mountain to honor the new god with the Theban women in their Bacchic revels.

In Sophocles' Oedipus Rex, Oedipus, the king of Thebes, calls upon Tiresias to aid in the investigation of the killing of the previous king Laius. At first, Tiresias refuses to give a direct answer and instead hints that the killer is someone Oedipus really does not wish to find. However, after being provoked to anger by Oedipus' accusation first that he has no foresight and then that Tiresias had a hand in the murder, he reveals that in fact it was Oedipus himself who had (unwittingly) committed the crime. Outraged, Oedipus throws him out of the palace, but then afterwards realizes the truth.

Tiresias also appears in Sophocles' Antigone. Creon, now king of Thebes, refuses to allow Polynices to be buried. His niece, Antigone, defies the order and is caught; Creon decrees that she is to be buried alive. The gods express their disapproval of Creon's decision through Tiresias, who tells Creon 'the city is sick through your fault.' 

Tiresias and his prophecy are also involved in the story of the Epigoni.

Death

Tiresias died after drinking water from the tainted spring Tilphussa, where he was impaled by an arrow of Apollo.

His shade descended to the Asphodel Meadows, the first level of Hades. After his death, he was visited in the underworld by Odysseus, to whom he gave valuable advice concerning the rest of his odyssey, such as how to get past Scylla and Charybdis. He also advised him not to eat the cattle of Helios on Thrinacia (advice which Odysseus' men did not follow, which led to them getting killed by Zeus' thunderbolts during a storm).

The caduceus

Connections with the paired serpents on the caduceus are often made (Brisson 1976:55–57).

In the arts
 The figure of Tiresias has been much invoked by fiction writers and poets. At the climax of Lucian of Samosata's Necyomantia, Tiresias in Hades is asked "what is the best way of life?" to which he responds, "the life of the ordinary guy: forget philosophers and their metaphysics."
 Tiresias appears in Dante's Inferno, in Canto XX, among the soothsayers in the Fourth Bolgia of the Eighth Circle, where augurs are punished by having their heads turned backwards; since they claimed to see the future in life, in the afterlife they are denied any forward vision. 
 The Breasts of Tiresias is a surrealist play by Guillaume Apollinaire written in 1903. The play received its first production in a revised version in 1917. In his preface to the play, the poet invented the word "surrealism" to describe his new style of drama. The French composer Francis Poulenc wrote an opera with the same name based on Apollinaire's 1917 play. It was first performed at the Opéra-Comique in 1947.
 "Tiresias" the poem by Alfred, Lord Tennyson, narrated by the persona Tiresias himself, incorporates the notion that his prophecies, though always true, are generally not believed.
 Tiresias is featured in T. S. Eliot's poem The Waste Land (Section III, The Fire Sermon) and in a note Eliot states that Tiresias is "the most important personage in the poem, uniting all the rest."
 Tiresias appears in Three Cantos III (1917) and cantos I and 47 in the long poem The Cantos by Ezra Pound.
 Virginia Woolf's Orlando is a modernist novel that uses major events in Tiresias' life.
 Tiresias is a ballet choreographed by Frederick Ashton to music by Constant Lambert first performed at the Royal Opera House Covent Garden, London, on 9 July 1951.
 "The Cinema Show", a song by the British progressive rock band Genesis from the 1973 album Selling England by the Pound refers to Tiresias as having lived as both genders "I have crossed between the poles, for me there's no mystery.  Once a man, like the sea I raged, once a woman, like the earth I gave".
 "Castle Walls", a song by American progressive rock band Styx on their 1977 album The Grand Illusion, makes reference to Tiresias in the refrain "Far beyond these castle walls; Where I thought I heard Tiresias say; Life is never what it seems; And every man must meet his destiny".
 Tiresia, a 2003 French film directed by Bertrand Bonello uses the legend of Tiresias to tell the story of a modern transgender person.
 Carol Ann Duffy's The World's Wife includes the poem "from Mrs Tiresias" which narrates the experience of Tiresias's wife after his transformation.

Notes

References
 Robert Graves, 1960 (revised edition). The Greek Myths
 Luc Brisson, 1976. Le mythe de Tirésias: essai d'analyse structurale (Leiden: Brill) Structural analysis by a follower of Claude Lévi-Strauss and a repertory of literary references and works of art in an iconographical supplement.
 N. Loraux, The Experienctersuchungen zur Figur des Sehers Teiresias, Tübingen, 1995
 E. Di Rocco, Io Tiresia: metamorfosi di un profeta, Roma, 2007

External links
 

Prophets
Mythological Greek seers
Classical oracles
Metamorphoses into the opposite sex in Greek mythology
Theban characters in Greek mythology
Deeds of Athena
Katabasis
Deeds of Zeus
Mythological blind people
Transgender topics and mythology
LGBT themes in Greek mythology
Deeds of Hera
Deeds of Apollo
Deeds of Aphrodite
Metamorphoses into animals in Greek mythology